Humphrey Thomas Norrington OBE is A British Music Producer also the second son of Sir Arthur Norrington, who was known to his friends as "Thomas", and devised the Norrington Table. He is also the brother of Sir Roger Norrington.

He was a Vice Chairman of Barclays Bank and is a Trustee of World Vision UK, Mildmay Mission Hospital, Premier Christian Media Trust and other charities.

References

British bankers
Officers of the Order of the British Empire
Living people
Year of birth missing (living people)